JS Teruzuki (DD-116) is the second ship of Akizuki-class destroyers. She was commissioned on 7 March 2013.

Construction and career
Teruzuki was laid down on June 2, 2010 at Mitsubishi Heavy Industries Nagasaki Shipyard & Machinery Works as the 5,000-ton type escort ship No. 2245 planned for FY2008 based on the medium-term defense capability development plan, launched and named on September 15, 2011. Sea trials started on July 28, 2012. Commissioned on March 7, 2013, it was transferred to the 6th Escort Corps of the 2nd Escort Corps and deployed in Yokosuka.

From September 20 to December 14, 2014, she participated in the TGEX KOA KAI EAST multilateral joint training conducted in the waters around San Diego, USA.

On March 11, 2017, the 27th dispatched anti-piracy action water squadron departed from Yokosuka base for the Gulf of Aden off the coast of Somalia. Participated in the Royal Malaysian Navy-sponsored International Fleet Review Ceremony and the Royal Malaysian Navy-sponsored multilateral maritime exercise from March 21 to 26, and joint training with the Royal Thai Navy on the 18th of the same month, and returned to Japan on the 1st of October.

From September 17 to 29 and October 15 to October 23rd, 2019, Japan-Australia joint training (Japan-Australia Trident) will be held in the sea and airspace from the south of Kanto to the west of Kyushu via the area around Okinawa. To do. In addition to this ship from the JMSDF, escort vessels JS Harusame, JS Asahi, JS Atago and JS Mashu and P-1 patrol aircraft or P-3C patrol aircraft and submarines, and ships and submarines from the Royal Australian Navy. Participated and conducted various tactical training.

From March 14 to April 28, 2020, participate in the first year of Reiwa practice voyage (flight). Initially, it was planned to call at Malaysia (Port Klang) and Brunei (Muara), but the port call was canceled due to the effects of the new coronavirus infection. On April 2, Japan-US joint training was conducted with the USS Gabrielle Giffords in the Andaman Sea.

From July 19 to 23 of the same year, she participated in the Japan-US-Australia joint training conducted in the sea and airspace from the South China Sea and the eastern offshore of the Philippines to the waters around Guam. USS Ronald Reagan, USS Antietam, USS Mustin from the US Navy, HMAS Canberra, HMAS Hobart, HMAS Arunta, HMAS Stuart and HMAS Sirius participated and conducted various tactical training.

Gallery

References

 

2011 ships
Ships built by Mitsubishi Heavy Industries
Akizuki-class destroyers (2010)